Zuan Francesco Venier (died 1518) was a co-lord of Cerigo.

Ancestry
He was a son of Moisé Venier (c. 1412 – c. 1476) and wife (married 1437) Caterina Vitturi, paternal grandson of Biagio Venier (died 1449) and wife (married 1406) Lucia Contarini, great-grandson of Antonio Venier.

Marriage and issue
He married in 1479 Fiorenza Sommaripa, Lady of Paros (died 1518), and had Nicolò Venier, Lord of Paros and Cecilia Venier.

References

1518 deaths
Zuan Francesco
Year of birth unknown
Kythira